Bomarea elegans is a species of flowering plants in the family Alstroemeriaceae. It is endemic to Ecuador, where it occurs in the forests and páramo of the Andes. It is threatened by fire, grazing, and mining.

References

elegans
Endemic flora of Ecuador
Vulnerable plants
Páramo flora
Taxonomy articles created by Polbot
Plants described in 1908